Proformica is a genus of ants in the subfamily Formicinae. The genus is known from the Palearctic realm, from Mongolia through Central Asia to Spain. Colonies are small, generally containing a few hundred individuals, with a single queen (monogyne) or multiple ergatogyne queens. Unique in the tribe Formicini, some species have specialized workers ("honeypot ants") gorged with food; they function as living storage containers.

Parasite host
Four species are host to obligate slave-making ants in the genus Rossomyrmex, with each species forming a coevolving pair:
Rossomyrmex proformicarum–Proformica epinotalis
Rossomyrmex quandratinodum–Proformica sp.
Rossomyrmex anatolicus–Proformica korbi
Rossomyrmex minuchae–Proformica longiseta

Species

Proformica alaica Kuznetsov-Ugamsky, 1926
Proformica buddhaensis Ruzsky, 1915
Proformica caucasea (Santschi, 1925)
Proformica coriacea Kuznetsov-Ugamsky, 1927
Proformica dolichocephala Kuznetsov-Ugamsky, 1927
Proformica epinotalis Kuznetsov-Ugamsky, 1927
Proformica ferreri Bondroit, 1918
Proformica flavosetosa (Viehmeyer, 1922)
Proformica jacoti (Wheeler, 1923)
Proformica kaszabi Dlussky, 1969
Proformica kobachidzei Arnol'di, 1968
Proformica korbi (Emery, 1909)
Proformica kosswigi (Donisthorpe, 1950)
Proformica kusnezowi (Santschi, 1928)
Proformica longiseta Collingwood, 1978
Proformica mongolica (Emery, 1901)
Proformica nasuta (Nylander, 1856)
Proformica nitida Kuznetsov-Ugamsky, 1923
Proformica oculatissima (Forel, 1886)
Proformica ossetica Dubovikoff, 2005
Proformica pilosiscapa Dlussky, 1969
Proformica seraphimi Tarbinsky, 1970
Proformica similis Dlussky, 1969
Proformica splendida Dlussky, 1965
Proformica striaticeps (Forel, 1911)

See also
Rossomyrmex, genus of ant that parasitizes Proformica species

References

External links

Formicinae
Ant genera